Sardar Ghulam Abid Khan is a Pakistani politician who has been a member of the Provincial Assembly of Sindh since August 2018. He previously had served in this role from May 2013 to May 2018.

Early life and education
He was born on 1 October 1972 in Kandhkot.

He has graduated from Shah Abdul Latif University in Khairpur.

Political career
He was elected to the Provincial Assembly of Sindh as a candidate of Pakistan Peoples Party (PPP) from PS-17 Kashmore-I in 2013 Sindh provincial election.

He was re-elected to Provincial Assembly of Sindh as a candidate of PPP from PS-5 Kashmore-II in 2018 Sindh provincial election.

References

Living people
Sindh MPAs 2013–2018
1972 births
Pakistan People's Party MPAs (Sindh)
Sindh MPAs 2018–2023